Channichthys irinae, the pygmy icefish, is a species of marine ray-finned fish belonging to the family Channichthyidae, the crocodile icefishes. It is endemic to the Kerguelen Islands in the Southern Ocean.

Taxonomy
Channichthys irinae was first formally described in 1995 by the Ukrainian based ichthyologist Gennadiy A. Shandikov with the type locality given as the southwestern Indian Ocean, northeast of Kerguelen Island. Fishbase treats it as a valid species but Catalog of Fishes treats it as a junior synonym of C. panticapaei.

Description
This species is very similar to Channichthys mithridatis (to which it is closely related), but it has more gill rakers in more and longer rows (21 to 30 in two rows for C. irinae compared to 11 to 16 in one row for C. mithraditis). Distinguishing factors from other Channichthys species also include the fact that it has the largest eye diameter relative to snout length (45.9% at the very least, with specimens sometimes reaching 56%).

Distribution, habitat and biology
Channichthys irinae is endemic to the Southern Ocean around the Kerguelen Islands. This species mainly feeds on pelagic zooplankton and is of no interest to commercial fisheries.

References

irinae
Fish of the Southern Ocean
Fauna of the Kerguelen Islands
Fish described in 1995